Tim Thomas Brdarić (born 4 July 2000) is a German professional footballer who plays as a defender for Wattenscheid.

Career
In 2019, Brdaric trialled for American side Atlanta United.

Before the second half of the 2020–21 season, he signed for Vllaznia in the Albanian top flight after playing for German fifth division club 1. FC Monheim. On 18 April 2021, he debuted for Vllaznia during a 6–0 win over Apolonia. On 18 April 2021, Brdaric scored his first goal for Vllaznia during a 6–0 win over Apolonia.

Personal life
He is the son of former Germany international Thomas Brdaric.

Career statistics

References

External links
 

2000 births
Footballers from Düsseldorf
German people of Croatian descent
Living people
German footballers
Association football defenders
KF Vllaznia Shkodër players
FC Rot-Weiß Koblenz players
KFC Uerdingen 05 players
SG Wattenscheid 09 players
Kategoria Superiore players
Regionalliga players
Oberliga (football) players
German expatriate footballers
German expatriate sportspeople in the United States
Expatriate soccer players in the United States
German expatriate sportspeople in Albania
Expatriate footballers in Albania